Elections to the Roxburgh District Council took place in May 1992, alongside elections to the councils of Scotland's various other districts.

Aggregate results

References

Roxburgh District Council elections
1992 Scottish local elections